Elbert Joseph "Bertie" Higgins (born December 8, 1944) is an American singer-songwriter. In 1982, Higgins had a top 40 album with Just Another Day in Paradise. It spawned the hit song "Key Largo", which referenced the Humphrey Bogart and Lauren Bacall film of the same name and reached No. 8 on the US Billboard Hot 100, No. 1 on the Billboard Adult Contemporary chart and No. 50 on the Billboard Country chart.

Early career
Higgins was born in Tarpon Springs, Florida, United States, and is of Portuguese, Irish and German descent. He once supported himself as a sponge diver, and began his career in show business at the age of twelve as a ventriloquist. He won prizes in local talent contests and became a favorite at school assemblies around Tampa Bay, Florida. Higgins has stated that he is related to German poet, Johann Wolfgang von Goethe.

Higgins' first band played proms, homecoming dances, and sock hops. After graduating Tarpon Springs High School, Higgins enrolled in St. Petersburg College to study journalism and fine art. He eventually left college and became a drummer for the Tommy Roe band and The Roemans, and played alongside such groups as The Rolling Stones and The Beach Boys.

Tiring of the rigors of the road and yearning to make his own musical statement, Higgins left The Roemans and returned home to Florida. He put down his drumsticks, picked up a guitar and began crafting music and lyrics. Music producers such as Bob Crewe, Phil Gernhard, and Felton Jarvis took an interest in him and contributed to the growth of the young songwriter. Higgins' talent flourished and he was in demand to play venues throughout the state. During this period, he also met and became a protégé of actor/director Burt Reynolds, who saw Higgins' writing potential and tutored him in screenwriting.

Music career
In 1980, Higgins moved to Atlanta and met record producer Sonny Limbo. He arranged a meeting between Higgins and music publisher Bill Lowery, whom Higgins had known through Tommy Roe. Higgins had been working on a song about a failed romance and presented the rough cut to Lowery and Limbo. They helped him perfect the lyrics of the song that became "Key Largo" Higgins recorded the master and presented it to Kat Family Records, a newly formed CBS/Sony distributing company. After an initial rejection, Kat Family agreed to release the single. The song eventually landed in the Billboard pop charts at number eight, and in the Billboard adult contemporary charts it reached number one.  It also charted in the Billboard country chart. On the strength of the song's success, an album was released titled Just Another Day in Paradise. Other singles followed, such as "Just Another Day in Paradise", "Casablanca", and "Pirates and Poets", but none matched the success domestically of his breakout hit. (The song "Casablanca" went on to become a major hit in the Pacific Rim countries, and "Key Largo" reached number one status in Canada, Australia and other countries internationally.)

For the past several years, Higgins and his band have toured extensively around the globe, and he continues to tour on a regular basis in the Pacific Rim and domestically.

Later years
Higgins has served on the Board of Governors of the Atlanta Chapter of the Academy of Recording Arts and Sciences for several years. Besides maintaining a rigorous schedule of one-nighters, he also makes regular appearances on the Las Vegas strip.

In recent years, Higgins has moved into film production with his sons Julian and Aaron, producing Beast Beneath (distributed by Entertainment One), 2009's Poker Run (also distributed by Entertainment One) and 2012's The Colombian Connection, starring Tom Sizemore and "Christmas in Hollywood".

Legacy
He was inducted into the Florida Music Hall of Fame with a lifetime achievement award in January 2016 along with Jimmy Buffett, Julio Iglesias and Tom Petty. In 2019 he was also inducted in the Florida Artists Hall of Fame along with such notables as Ernest Hemingway.

Jazz vocalist Nancy Wilson recorded a version of the Bertie Higgins original song "Casablanca" for EMI Records.

In 2009, "Key Largo" was ranked No. 75 on VH1's 100 Greatest One-Hit Wonders of the 80s.

His die-hard fans are called "Boneheads".

Discography

Albums

Singles

Music videos

References

External links
Official YouTube channel

1944 births
Living people
People from Tarpon Springs, Florida
American male pop singers
American soft rock musicians
Songwriters from Florida
American people of German descent
American people of Irish descent
American people of Portuguese descent
Singers from Florida
Epic Records artists
American male songwriters